The following is a list of football stadiums in Slovenia, ordered by capacity. Only stadiums with a seating capacity of 1,000 or more are included.

Current stadiums

Note: For stadium capacity only numbers of seating area is used, without the standing areas.

References

 
Slovenia
Stadiums
Football stadiums